Mount Côté is located on the border of Alberta and British Columbia. The mountain is named for Jean Côté, a Canadian politician.

See also
List of peaks on the British Columbia–Alberta border

References

Two-thousanders of Alberta
Two-thousanders of British Columbia
Canadian Rockies